The 2017–18 Division 1 Féminine season was the 44th edition since its establishment. Lyon were the defending champions, having won the title in each of the past eleven seasons. The season began on 3 September 2017 and ended on 27 May 2018. Lyon won their twelfth straight title.

Teams

 changed its name to Paris FC. Two teams were promoted from the Division 2 Féminine, the second level of women's football in France, to replace two teams that were relegated from the Division 1 Féminine following the 2016–17 season. A total of 12 teams currently compete in the league; two clubs will be relegated to the second division at the end of the season.

Teams promoted to 2017–18 Division 1 Féminine
 Lille
 Fleury

Teams relegated to 2017–18 Division 2 Féminine
 Saint-Étienne
 Metz

Stadia and locations

League standings

League table

Positions by round

Results

Season statistics

Top scorers

Top assists

References

External links
 Official website

Fra
2017
1